Robert Gibson Rayburn (January 14, 1915 – January 5, 1990) was an American pastor and college president.

Personal life
Rayburn was born in Newton, Kansas, to James Chalmers Rayburn, Sr. (an evangelist for the Presbyterian Church), and Elna Beck Rayburn. Robert was one of four sons.  His oldest brother, James, also a Presbyterian minister, would go on to found the Christian organization Young Life in 1941.

Rayburn studied at Wheaton College, Omaha Presbyterian Theological Seminary, and Dallas Theological Seminary. He served as a chaplain in the U.S. Army from 1944 to 1946, and again from 1950 to 1952, during the Korean War. Between these two terms of service, he was pastor of College Church in Wheaton, Illinois.

Ministry
Rayburn served as president of Highland College in Pasadena, California from 1952 to 1956. In 1956, he joined with the Evangelical Presbyterian Church in parting ways with Carl McIntire's Bible Presbyterian Church. He became the founding president of Covenant College, which belonged to the new denomination, and then founding president of Covenant Theological Seminary. He relinquished the presidency of the college in 1965 after it relocated from St. Louis, Missouri to Lookout Mountain, Georgia, but remained president of the seminary until 1977; by then, it had followed the EPC into the Presbyterian Church in America. He died of cancer in 1990.

Rayburn wrote O Come Let Us Worship in 1980, in which he "sought to reintroduce evangelicalism to its history and liturgy." According to Bryan Chapell, Rayburn "became the vanguard" of "modern integrative liturgies", anticipating the work of Robert E. Webber, Thomas C. Oden, and Hughes Oliphant Old.

The chapel on the campus of Covenant Theological Seminary in St. Louis is named in honor of its founding president.

Rayburn College, in Manipur, India, is named after him.

Rayburn had four children, including Robert S. Rayburn and Bentley Rayburn. He is buried at the Jefferson Barracks National Cemetery.

References

1915 births
1990 deaths
People from Newton, Kansas
United States Army chaplains
Wheaton College (Illinois) alumni
Dallas Theological Seminary alumni
Presbyterian Church in America ministers
American Calvinist and Reformed theologians
Presidents of Calvinist and Reformed seminaries
Heads of universities and colleges in the United States
Covenant Theological Seminary faculty
20th-century American clergy
Deaths from cancer in Missouri
20th-century American academics